Kamp-e Abbas (also Romanized as Kamp-e ‘Abbās) is a village in Julaki Rural District, Jayezan District, Omidiyeh County, Khuzestan Province, Iran. At the 2006 census, its population was 50, in 11 families.

References 

Populated places in Omidiyeh County